Ukkonen is a Finnish surname. Notable people with the surname include:

 Esko Ukkonen (born 1950), Finnish theoretical computer scientist
 Kari Ukkonen (born 1961), Finnish footballer and manager

Finnish-language surnames